Burney Lamar (born August 21, 1980) is an American stock car racing driver. He has driven in both the NASCAR Xfinity Series and Camping World Truck Series.

Racing career
Lamar began racing go-karts at the age of 5 and won a total of 25 track championships and three International Karting Federation Regional titles. At the age of 16, Lamar started racing stock cars at Stockton 99 Speedway and finished eleventh in points. Over the next three years, he raced on many West Coast short tracks and won the Shell Oil Tri-Track championship.

In the year 2000, Lamar began racing in the USAC Western States Sprint Car Series. He posted seven top-fives and finished third in points, winning Rookie of the Year. The following year, he joined the NASCAR AutoZone Elite Division Southwest Series, and would win Rookie of the Year that year as well. He would go on to win two races and finish second in points in 2002.

Lamar signed with Kevin Harvick Incorporated in 2005, competing in a limited number of NASCAR Busch Series, Craftsman Truck Series and NASCAR Grand National Division, West Series races. In addition to two victories in the West Series, Lamar also won the Copper World Classic at Phoenix International Raceway that season. In the Truck Series, he raced the No. 92 Chevrolet Silverado twice, with a best finish of 21st. He qualified 8th in his Busch Series debut in the No. 33 Chevrolet but wrecked early in that race and finished 41st. He would begin racing in the Busch Series full time in 2006 in the No. 77 Chevrolet and began the season with a second-place finish at Daytona International Speedway. After two additional top-tens in the first third of the season, Lamar's results began to fall off, and he was removed from the ride late in the season at the request of Dollar General, who wanted NEXTEL Cup drivers in the car.

Lamar attempted to make his Nextel Cup Series debut at the October race at Atlanta Motor Speedway and at the November race at Texas Motor Speedway in the Carter Simo Racing No. 08 Dodge but failed to qualify for both races. After failing to qualify for several attempts with E&M in the Cup Series, he returned to the Nationwide Series to drive the No. 37 Ford Fusion for Gary Baker. Later in the season, he signed to drive the No. 05 Ford for Day Enterprises.

On October 10, 2008, it was announced that Lamar would share the Braun Racing No. 32 Toyota in 2009 with Brian Vickers. He was again released after one top-10 in his first few races of 2009.

Personal life
In the fall of 2006, he was engaged to model Niki Taylor after just three dates. Taylor is five years older. They wed on December 27, 2006 at the Grande Colonial Hotel in La Jolla, California. Instead of gifts, the couple asked for donations to be sent to Victory Junction Gang Camp, a camp for terminally ill children in North Carolina.

His first child, daughter was born on March 4, 2009, one day before his wife's 34th birthday. On November 16, 2011, Taylor gave birth to her second child with Lamar, a son. He appeared in a March 2009 magazine advertisement for Skechers Footwear with his pregnant wife and her twin sons from her marriage to Miami Hooters linebacker Matt Martinez.

Until recently, Lamar worked as a flight instructor for Airline Transport Professionals in Nashville, Tennessee. He was hired by Mesa Airlines in November 2013 (Mesa contractually flies as US Airways Express as well as United Express). During his time at ATP he was known by the nickname "Blue Falcon."

Motorsports career results

NASCAR
(key) (Bold – Pole position awarded by qualifying time. Italics – Pole position earned by points standings or practice time. * – Most laps led.)

Sprint Cup Series

Nationwide Series

Craftsman Truck Series

West Series

ARCA Re/Max Series
(key) (Bold – Pole position awarded by qualifying time. Italics – Pole position earned by points standings or practice time. * – Most laps led.)

References

External links
 

Living people
1980 births
People from West Sacramento, California
Racing drivers from Sacramento, California
NASCAR drivers
Richard Childress Racing drivers